Pichinia is a monotypic genus of flowering plants belonging to the family Araceae. The only species is Pichinia disticha.

The species is found in Borneo.

References

Araceae
Monotypic Araceae genera